MovieScore Media is a Swedish record label devoted to original film scores, founded in 2005 by former film music journalist Mikael Carlsson. The label has produced over 500 soundtrack albums, focusing primarily on scores composed by up and coming composers and from smaller, independent feature films. However, the label has also released soundtracks by established composers, including Academy Award-winning composers Dario Marianelli and Gabriel Yared, Grammy Award-nominated composer Ryan Shore, Basil Poledouris and Michael Kamen and Ivor Novello Award-winning composer Francis Shaw, as well as from films and television shows by bigger studios and companies, such as Warner Bros., BBC and Constantin Film.

In 2011, MovieScore Media launched a sub-label devoted exclusively to music from horror films, Screamworks Records, with the release of Stake Land by Jeff Grace as its first album.

In terms of distribution strategies, MovieScore Media was first introduced as an online label dedicated to digital distribution, primarily via Apple's iTunes Store, only. In 2007, the label expanded its business to include limited edition of CDs in addition to the established digital distribution. In 2021, the label's catalogue was acquired by Symphonic Distribution for worldwide digital distribution.

MovieScore Media has been nominated for the 'Film Music Record Label of the Year' award by the International Film Music Critics Association eleven times. Screamworks Records' release of Ryan Shore's soundtrack for The Shrine, received a 2012 Grammy Award nomination for Best Score Soundtrack for Visual Media.

References

External links
 MovieScore Media (official web site)
 Internet Movie Database

Swedish record labels
Record labels established in 2005
2005 establishments in Sweden